Sternwarte Peterberg is a club observatory in Saarland, Germany. Founded in 1977, it has 160 members as of 2016.

See also
List of astronomical observatories

References

Buildings and structures in Saarland
Astronomical observatories in Germany